Louise Leblanc (born June 10, 1942) is a Canadian writer living in Quebec.

She was born in Montreal and studied education at the Université de Montréal. Leblanc taught French and history and later worked as a researcher for television, as a freelance journalist for various magazines and as an advertising copywriter. In 1980, she published a collection of humorous observations 'l'Homme objet; that was followed by a novel 37½ AA in 1983 which won the Prix Robert-Cliche. In 1985, Leblanc wrote the script for the Radio-Canada television film Archimède. She has continued to write for television, including the series Les Enquêtes de Chlorophylle and several episodes for the series Watatatow. Leblanc has also published a number of short stories.

Selected works 
 Pop Corn, novel (1986)
 Le sang de l'or, novel (1989)
 Ça suffit Sophie!, juvenile fiction (1990)
 Sophie lance et compte!, juvenile fiction (1996)
 Deux amis dans la nuit, juvenile fiction (1996), received the Prix Québec-Wallonie-Bruxelles

References 

1942 births
Living people
Canadian children's writers in French
Writers from Montreal
Canadian women novelists
Canadian women short story writers
Canadian novelists in French
Canadian short story writers in French
20th-century Canadian novelists
20th-century Canadian short story writers
20th-century Canadian women writers
Canadian women children's writers